William McLennan was a New Zealand cricketer. He played one first-class match for Otago in 1879/80.

See also
 List of Otago representative cricketers

References

External links
 

Year of birth missing
Year of death missing
New Zealand cricketers
Otago cricketers
Place of birth missing